Between the Devil and the Deep Blue Sea is a young adult Gothic horror novel written by April Genevieve Tucholke and published on August 15, 2013 by Dial Books for Young Readers, an imprint of Penguin Books.

Plot
Nothing much exciting rolls through Violet White’s sleepy, seaside town…until River West comes along. River rents the guesthouse behind Violet’s crumbling estate, and as eerie, grim things start to happen, Violet begins to wonder about the boy living in her backyard. Is River just a crooked-smiling liar with pretty eyes and a mysterious past? Or could he be something more?

Violet’s grandmother always warned her about the Devil, but she never said he could be a dark-haired boy who takes naps in the sun, who likes coffee, who kisses you in a cemetery…who makes you want to kiss back. Violet’s already so knee-deep in love, she can’t see straight. And that’s just how River likes it.

Blending faded decadence and the thrilling dread of gothic horror, April Genevieve Tucholke weaves a dreamy, twisting contemporary romance, as gorgeously told as it is terrifying—a debut to watch.

Characters
Violet White: teenage girl, protagonist and narrator
River Redding: teenage boy with a mysterious past
Luke White: Violet's brother, artist
Sunshine Black: Violet's best friend
Neely Redding: River's brother
Freddie White: Violet's dead grandmother
Brodie Redding: Neely and River's half little brother and antagonist
Jack: a young boy who lives in echo and is distantly related to the whites

Reception
The critical reception for the book has been very positive. The book received starred reviews from School Library Journal, VOYA, and Booklist.  The School Library Journal reviewer wrote "Tucholke’s gothic tone, plot, and setting, complete with a deteriorating estate full of dark family secrets, is reminiscent of Daphne du Maurier or YA fare such as Kami Garcia’s and Margaret Stohl’s Beautiful Creatures." Booklist said of the book, "Tucholke paints this moody, gothic romance with a languid brush. Moments of horror nestle against warm, dreamy kisses." Publishers Weekly wrote of the novel, "Tucholke luxuriates in the details of small-town life, including her characters’ gourmand tendencies and their quick-witted interactions, in a chilling supernatural exploration of free will and reality’s fluidity."

Between the Devil and the Deep Blue Sea was nominated by YALSA for a Teens Top Ten award for books published in 2013.  The book was also a 2015 Kentucky Blue Grass Award Nominee, an Honorable Mention in the Westchester Fiction Awards, and a runner up in the 2013 YABC Choice Awards' Best Teen Horror/Thriller category,

Further reading
Cooper, Ilene. "Between the Devil and the Deep Blue Sea." Booklist 15 Oct 2013. Web. 02 Dec. 2013
Serra, Danielle. "Between the Devil and the Deep Blue Sea." School Library Journal 59.7 2013. Web. 02 Dec. 2013.
Publishers Weekly. "Between the Devil and the Deep Blue Sea." Publishers Weekly, 27 May 2013. Web. 02 Dec. 2013.

References

External links
Author's website

American young adult novels
2013 American novels
American gothic novels
American horror novels
Novels set in Maine
Fiction about the Devil
Dial Press books